Jason Lindner (born February 1, 1973) is an American pianist, keyboardist, synthesist, sound designer, composer, arranger and producer.

Life and career
Lindner was brought up in Brooklyn, New York City. His father played the piano and sang, and Jason began playing the piano at the age of 2. As a child, he liked heavy metal, then bebop and blues as a teenager. He attended the Fiorello H. LaGuardia High School of Music & Art and Performing Arts.

Lindner "made his mark during the 1990s", in part as leader of a big band that played at Smalls Jazz Club in New York City. He was also the club's house pianist around the time it opened in 1994. This band recorded the album Premonition in 1998 and it was released in 2000, by which time Lindner had changed to leading a quintet. He performed and arranged for vocalist Claudia Acuña's first album, Wind from the South.

By 2004, Lindner was leading an electric group that consisted of Jacques Schwarz-Bart (sax), Avishai Cohen (trumpet), Reggie Washington (bass), and Gene Jackson (drums). His Now Vs. Now band began in 2006 as a quintet, with Cohen, Baba (beatbox, rap), Panagiotis Andreou (bass), and Mark Guiliana (drums). Lindner commented that "I wasn't playing jazz quartet gigs anymore. I was playing in a place where we could really experiment sonically, using electric bass, the drummer playing more groove-oriented beats and less straight ahead swing. [...] I wanted to appeal to ordinary people and not just a jazz audience." In the first three months of 2015 he participated in recordings sessions for David Bowie's Blackstar. For this recording, he used nine keyboards and a grand piano. Lindner reported that his subsequent production work was influenced by the presence of Tony Visconti for the Bowie sessions.

Compositions
A 2004 observer commented that Lindner's compositions are often "buoyant, singable melodies enlivened by circular, interlocking rhythms that often coalesce, swell and burst into euphoric exclamations [...with] a mesmerizing, transportive vibe that seamlessly reconciles elements of Afro-Cuban, modern and modal jazz with R&B, hip-hop and house music." Between the release of Now Vs. Now's first and second albums, Lindner's compositions became influenced more by electronica.

Awards
In 2009, Lindner's band was the winner of the Big Band Rising Star category in Down Beat magazine's critics' poll. Lindner was Down Beat'''s critics' poll winner of the Keyboard Rising Star category in 2013. In 2015, his band again won the Big Band Rising Star category in the Down Beat'' critics' poll.

Discography
An asterisk (*) indicates that the year is that of release.

As leader/co-leader

As sideman

References

1973 births
Living people
American jazz pianists
American male pianists
Musicians from New York City
Fiorello H. LaGuardia High School alumni
Pharaoh's Daughter members
Jazz musicians from New York (state)
21st-century American pianists
21st-century American male musicians
American male jazz musicians
Sunnyside Records artists
Fresh Sounds Records artists